Cladinose is a hexose deoxy sugar that in several antibiotics (such as erythromycin) is attached to the macrolide ring.

In ketolides, a relatively new class of antibiotics, the cladinose is replaced with a keto group.

External links
 
 PubChem
 Diagrams

Deoxy sugars
Monosaccharides